General Watson may refer to:

Andrew Watson (British Army officer) (born 1927), British Army major general
Daril Watson (1888−1967), British Army general
David Watson (general) (1869–1922), Canadian Corps major general
Edwin "Pa" Watson (1883–1945), U.S. Army major general
Harry Davis Watson (1866–1945), British Army major general
James Watson (British Army officer) (1772–1862), British Army lieutenant general
John Watson (Indian Army officer) (1829–1919), British Indian Army general
Leroy H. Watson (1893–1975), U.S. Army major general
Thomas E. Watson (USMC) (1892–1966), U.S. Marine Corps lieutenant general